Ishtiaq Ahmad or Ishtiaq Ahmed is the name of:
 Ishtiaq Ahmad (fiction writer) (1944–2015), Pakistani fiction writer
 Ishtiaq Ahmed (political scientist) (born 1947), Swedish political scientist
 Ishtiaq Ahmed (field hockey) (born 1962), Pakistani field hockey player
 Jagdeep (born Jagdeep Syed Ishtiaq Ahmed Jaffry 1939), Indian film actor
 Ishtiaq Ahmed (cricketer) (born 1977), Bangladeshi umpire and former cricketer